Gustaf 'Valter' Eugen Kolmodin (1910-1952), was a male Swedish international table tennis player.

He won a bronze medal at the 1930 World Table Tennis Championships in the men's doubles with Hille Nilsson and a silver medal in the men's team event.

See also
 List of table tennis players
 List of World Table Tennis Championships medalists

References

Swedish male table tennis players
1910 births
1952 deaths
World Table Tennis Championships medalists
Sportspeople from Linköping
Sportspeople from Östergötland County